Odessa Zion Segall Adlon (born June 17, 2000), also known as Odessa A'zion, is an American actress. She is known for her television roles in the CBS series Fam and the Netflix series Grand Army.

Early life and education
A'zion is from Los Angeles and also spent parts of her childhood in Boston and Neufahrn, Germany. She is the daughter of actress Pamela Adlon and German director Felix O. Adlon, and the middle child between Gideon Adlon and Valentine "Rocky" Adlon. Her paternal grandfather is German filmmaker Percy Adlon and her maternal grandfather was American writer-producer Don Segall, who was born to a Jewish family; her English maternal grandmother, originally an Anglican, converted to Judaism.

A'zion attended Charter High School of the Arts (CHAMPS).

Career
She was initially credited as Odessa Adlon. A'zion landed her first notable role in 2017 as Liv in season 5 of Nashville. Her film roles include the 2018 film Ladyworld and the 2020 horror film Let's Scare Julie. She appeared in 2 episodes of Wayne.

A'zion landed her first main role as Shannon, the younger sister of Nina Dobrev's character, in the 2019 CBS sitcom Fam. In October 2019, it was announced A'zion would star as Joey Del Marco, the lead character from Slut: The Play, in the 2020 Netflix series Grand Army. She and Odley Jean received critical acclaim for their performances.

A'zion played Lana in the independent comedy film Mark, Mary & Some Other People (2021). She has roles in several upcoming horror and thriller films such as Hell House, The Inhabitant, Hellraiser, For the Night, as well as the drama Good Girl Jane.

In December 2021, A'zion was cast in Fresh Kills written and directed by Jennifer Esposito, who will also star.

Filmography

Film

Television

References

External links
 

2000 births
Living people
21st-century American actresses
Actors from Bavaria
Actresses from Boston
Actresses from Los Angeles
Odessa
American child actresses
American film actresses
American television actresses
American people of English descent
American people of German descent
American people of Russian-Jewish descent
American people of Ukrainian-Jewish descent
Jewish American actresses
21st-century American Jews